Loes Geurts (born 12 January 1986) is a Dutch footballer who plays as a goalkeeper for Damallsvenskan club BK Häcken. Since making her international debut in 2005, Geurts has collected over 100 caps for the Netherlands national team. She kept goal for the Netherlands at the 2009 and 2013 editions of the UEFA Women's Championship.

Club career
Geurts' career started at the youth team of club RES in Bolsward. She then played for SC Heerenveen for one season, before returning to RES. In 2004 she played American college soccer for Western Illinois Leathernecks, returning to Europe in March 2006 for the second half of the 2005–06, joining Bundesliga team FFC Heike Rheine.

In 2007, Geurts returned to the Netherlands to play in the newly created professional league Eredivisie with AZ Alkmaar. Her four seasons at the club were very successful, winning the league title three times and the Dutch Cup once. In 2011, she moved to Telstar.

She left Telstar for Sweden's Damallsvenskan in 2012 and joined Vittsjö GIK. Geurts left Vittsjö after her second season in November 2013, signing for Kopparbergs/Göteborg FC, who were in the market for a goalkeeper following Kristin Hammarström's retirement.

After five seasons during four years in Sweden, on 21 September 2016, it was announced she signed a two-year contract with Paris Saint-Germain of the Division 1 Féminine.

In August 2017, citing her "battery was empty", Geurts announced she was taking a break from football.

On 31 January 2018, it was announced that Geurts was returning to Kopparbergs/Göteborg FC where she had previously played from 2014 to 2016.

International career

On 20 August 2005, at the age of 19, Geurts was given her debut in the senior Netherlands national team by coach Vera Pauw, playing in a 4–0 defeat to Finland in Oulu.

In 2006, Geurts was elevated to first-choice goalkeeper for the Netherlands when Marleen Wissink retired. Geurts played in every match as the Netherlands reached the semi-final of UEFA Women's Euro 2009.

In June 2013, national team coach Roger Reijners selected Geurts in the squad for UEFA Women's Euro 2013 in Sweden. She was also part of the Dutch squads of the 2015 and 2019 World Cup as well as the winning team of the UEFA Women's Euro 2017.

Honours
AZ Alkmaar
 Eredivisie: 2007–08, 2008–09, 2009–10
 KNVB Women's Cup: 2010–11

Netherlands
 UEFA European Women's Championship: 2017

References

External links

 
 
 Player German domestic football stats  at DFB
 
 Profile at Onsoranje.nl 
 Profile at vrouwenvoetbalnederland.nl 
 

1986 births
Living people
Dutch women's footballers
Footballers from Friesland
Netherlands women's international footballers
People from Wûnseradiel
Eredivisie (women) players
Damallsvenskan players
Vittsjö GIK players
BK Häcken FF players
AZ Alkmaar (women) players
FFC Heike Rheine players
Telstar (women's football club) players
Paris Saint-Germain Féminine players
2015 FIFA Women's World Cup players
Expatriate women's footballers in Germany
Expatriate women's footballers in Sweden
Expatriate women's footballers in France
Expatriate women's soccer players in the United States
Western Illinois University alumni
Western Illinois Leathernecks women's soccer players
FIFA Century Club
Division 1 Féminine players
UEFA Women's Championship-winning players
Women's association football goalkeepers
2019 FIFA Women's World Cup players
Dutch expatriate women's footballers
Dutch expatriate sportspeople in Sweden
Dutch expatriate sportspeople in France
Dutch expatriate sportspeople in Germany
Dutch expatriate sportspeople in the United States
Footballers at the 2020 Summer Olympics
Olympic footballers of the Netherlands
UEFA Women's Euro 2017 players